Tapia may refer to:

Places
 Tapia de Casariego, a town in Asturias, Spain
 Villanueva de Tapia, a town and municipality in Málaga, Spain
 Tapia, part of Lugoj in Timiş, Romania
 Tapia, a city in Tucumán, Argentina

Other uses
 Tapia (tree) (Uapaca bojeri), a plant species endemic to Madagascar
 A Spanish term for tabby concrete

People with the surname
 Abel Tapia (born 1949), American politician
 Alejandro Tapia y Rivera (1826–1882), Puerto Rican writer
 Anthony Tapia (born 1987), Colombian footballer
 Antonio Tapia (born 1949), Spanish footballer and football coach
 Augusto Tapia (1893–1966), Argentine geologist and paleontologist who described Notoceratops
 Bill Tapia (1908–2011), American musician
 Carlos Tapia (disambiguation), multiple people
 Domingo Tapia (born 1991), Dominican baseball player
 Gene Tapia (1925–2005), American race car driver
 Gloria Tapia (born 1972), Swedish actress
 Héctor Tapia (born 1977), Chilean-Italian footballer
 Humberto Tapia (1986–2011), Mexican boxer
 Johnny Tapia (1967–2012), American boxer
 José Tapia (born 1905), Cuban football coach
 José Félix Tapia (1910–1969), Spanish writer
 Keith Tapia (born 1990), Puerto Rican boxer
 Leonidas Tapia (?-1977), a Puebloan potter
 Luis Tapia (disambiguation), multiple people
 Manny Tapia (born 1981), American mixed martial arts fighter
 Margarita Tapia (born 1976), Mexican runner
 Miguel Tapia (born 1964), Chilean musician
 Nabila Tapia (born 1992), Dominican beauty pageant winner
 Nelson Tapia (born 1966), Chilean footballer
 Pedro Tapia (1582–1657), Spanish Archbishop
 Raimel Tapia (born 1994), Dominican baseball player
 Ramón Tapia (1932–1984), Chilean boxer
 Renato Tapia (born 1995), Peruvian footballer
 Richard A. Tapia (born 1939), American mathematician
 Tiburcio Tapia Mexican soldier, merchant, winery and ranch owner
 Yoel Tapia (born 1984), Dominican sprinter